The Muscat Classic is a cycling race held annually in and around the capital city of Oman, Muscat. It was created in 2023 and is part of UCI Asia Tour in category 1.1.

Winners

References

Cycle races in Oman
UCI Asia Tour races
Recurring sporting events established in 2023
2023 establishments in Oman
Sport in Oman